The 1970–71 European Cup was the 11th edition of Europe's premier club handball tournament.

Knockout stage

Round 1

|}

Round 2

|}

Quarterfinals

|}

Semifinals

|}

Finals

|}

External links
 EHF Champions League website
 European Cup 1971 edition

EHF Champions League seasons
Champions League
Champions League